Jack Dangermond (born 1945) is an American billionaire businessman and environmental scientist, who in 1969 co-founded, with Laura Dangermond, the Environmental Systems Research Institute (Esri), a privately held geographic information systems (GIS) software company. As of October 2021, his net worth was estimated at US$8.6 billion.

Dangermond, Esri's president, works at its headquarters in Redlands, California. He founded the company to perform land-use analysis; however, its focus evolved into GIS-software development, highlighted by the release of ARC/INFO in the early 1980s. The development and marketing of ARC/INFO positioned Esri with the dominant market share among GIS-software developers. Esri's flagship product, ArcGIS, traces its heritage to Dangermond's initial efforts in developing ARC/INFO.

Career
Dangermond grew up in Redlands, the son of Dutch immigrants. His parents owned a plant nursery in the town. Dangermond attended Redlands High School.

Dangermond completed his undergraduate degree in landscape architecture at California State Polytechnic University, Pomona. He then earned a Master in Urban Planning from the University of Minnesota, and a Master of Landscape Architecture degree from the Harvard University Graduate School of Design in 1969. His early work in the school's Laboratory for Computer Graphics and Spatial Analysis (LCGSA) led directly to the development of Esri's ARC/INFO GIS software. He has been awarded 13 honorary doctoral degrees.

Philanthropy
In December 2017, Jack and Laura Dangermond donated $165 million to establish the Jack and Laura Dangermond Preserve on the Pacific coast—the largest ever gift to The Nature Conservancy.

Jack and Laura Dangermond have signed The Giving Pledge.

In January 2020, Jack and Laura Dangermond donated $3 million to the Museum of Redlands fund.

Honors
Dangermond has received many awards, including:
 Officier in de Orde van Oranje Nassau 
 Horwood Distinguished Service Award of the Urban and Regional Information Systems Association in 1988
 John Wesley Powell Award of the U.S. Geological Survey in 1996
 Anderson Medal of the Association of American Geographers in 1998
 Cullum Geographical Medal of the American Geographical Society in 1999
 EDUCAUSE Medal of EduCause
 Honorary doctorate from the University of West-Hungary in 2003
 Carl Mannerfelt Gold Medal of the International Cartographic Association in 2007
 Honorary doctorate from the University of Minnesota in 2008
 Patron's Medal of the Royal Geographical Society in 2010.
 Alexander Graham Bell Medal of the National Geographic Society in 2010, together with Roger Tomlinson.
 Fellow of the University Consortium for Geographic Information Science in 2012
 Audubon Medal of the National Audubon Society in 2015
Recipient of the Lifetime Achievement Award (Champions of the Earth) in 2013.

References

External links

 Cultivating His Plants, and His Company, The New York Times, 2011
 Fact-Checking 'Corner Office', The Atlantic, 2011
 A Sense of Where You Are, Forbes.com, 2010
 Mapmaker Follows His Own Path (PDF), Financial Times, 2010
 The Passion and the Perseverance to Succeed, The Washington Post, 2010
 Computerworld Interview Q&A: Esri's Jack Dangermond on Cloud, Big Data and Apple-vs-Google Map Wars (July 2012)
 New York Times Corner Office Cultivating His Plants, and His Company (July 2011)
 Investor's Business Daily article Jack Dangermond's Digital Mapping Lays It All Out (August 2009)
 Jack Dangermond, Esri President – Biographical information on Esri's Web site
 Biography – Center for Spatially Integrated Social Science (CSISS) Advisory Board members
 Dangermond talks about various topics on the Ralph Nader Radio Hour

1945 births
Living people
American people of Dutch descent
American billionaires
American geographers
Businesspeople in software
California State Polytechnic University, Pomona alumni
Environmental scientists
Humphrey School of Public Affairs alumni
Harvard Graduate School of Design alumni
Recipients of the Cullum Geographical Medal
National Geographic Society medals recipients
American technology company founders
Giving Pledgers
21st-century philanthropists
Recipients of the Royal Geographical Society Patron's Medal
Geographic data and information professionals